"Amagents" is a single by South African singer and songwriter Samthing Soweto, released on  June 24, 2022 by Youbuntu. It debuted number one in South Africa. The song was certified gold by the Recording Industry of South Africa (RiSA).

Background 
Samthing first teased  the song "Amagents" on his Instagram account in March 2022. After many delays the song was released 2 months later on June 24, 2022.

Commercial Performance 
Upon its release it debuted number one in South Africa. The song was certified gold by the Recording Industry of South Africa (RiSA), 20 days after its initial release day.

Charts

Release history

References 

2022 singles
2022 songs
Number-one singles in South Africa